Muhammad Zubair Aslam, (24 November 1960 – 10 September 1991) popularly known as Jhara Pahalwan (Urdu: جھارا پہلوان) was a Pakistani wrestler who remained undefeated in his career.

In 1979, Jhara defeated Japanese wrestler Antonio Inoki in the fifth round who defeated his uncle Aki wrestler previously. Later, Jhara and Inoki became good friends.

Career
Jhara, at the age of just 16, started wrestling internationally. His height was six-foot-two-inches and weighed in at approximately 96 kilogrammes. In the early days, Jhara fought his first professional wrestling matches with the Zawar Multani Pehlwan in Multan and defeated him twice. He also holds the titles of the Fakhar-e-Pakistan and Rustam-e-Pakistan.
On June 17, 1979, Jhara fought with Antonio Inoki. However, before the bell even rang for the sixth round, the wrestler Inoki admitted defeat.

Death
He died of heart failure on 10 September 1991. He was buried at Bholu Pahalwan Gymnasium, Lahore. In 2015, Antonio Inoki announced to take Jhara's nephew Haroon Abid under his guardianship in Japan.

See also
Bholu Brothers
The Great Gama
Aslam Pahalwan

References

1960 births
1991 deaths
20th-century professional wrestlers
Sportspeople from Lahore
Pakistani professional wrestlers
Recipients of the Pride of Performance
Sport wrestlers from Punjab, Pakistan
Pakistani people of Kashmiri descent
People from Lahore